The Mighty Eighth may refer to:

The Eighth Air Force, a numbered air force (NAF) of the United States Air Force
The Mighty Eighth, the reported working title of an upcoming Apple TV+ miniseries based on a book by Donald L. Miller
B-17 Flying Fortress: The Mighty 8th, a combat flight simulation videogame published in 2000